EvoSuite is a tool that automatically generates unit tests for Java software. EvoSuite uses an evolutionary algorithm to generate JUnit tests. EvoSuite can be run from the command line, and it also has plugins to integrate it in Maven, IntelliJ and Eclipse. EvoSuite has been used on more than a hundred open-source software and several industrial systems, finding thousands of potential bugs.

History
EvoSuite was originally created in 2010 as output of a research project by Dr. Gordon Fraser and Dr. Andrea Arcuri. EvoSuite is currently released under LGPL license, and its source code is hosted on GitHub. In academia, EvoSuite is often referred as one of the main reference tools for search-based software testing.

Other usages
As EvoSuite is released as open-source (and so freely available to download and modify), it has been used as a reference tool for search-based software testing in a number of independent studies, like:
 Comparison with other tools like Pex, CATG, jPET and SPF
 Extension to system level testing for XML inputs
 Extension to study many-objective genetic algorithms

See also
 Test data generation
 Search-based software engineering
 Test automation
 List of unit testing frameworks
 Unit testing

Bibliography

References

External links

EvoSuite publications page

Java platform software